In music, Op. 84 stands for Opus number 84. Compositions that are assigned this number include:

 Aleš – The Jacobin
 Beethoven – Egmont
 Dvořák – The Jacobin
 Elgar – Piano Quintet
 Prokofiev – Piano Sonata No. 8
 Schumann – Beim Abschied zu singen for chorus & winds
 Strauss – Japanese Festival Music